Adenopodia rotundifolia is a species of plant in the family Fabaceae. It is found in Somalia and Tanzania.

References

Mimosoids
Flora of Somalia
Flora of Tanzania
Vulnerable plants
Taxonomy articles created by Polbot